Klára Bláhová (born 2 April 1973) is a Czech former professional tennis player.

Bláhová made her only WTA Tour main-draw appearance at the 1993 San Marino Open, when she featured as a qualifier and was beaten in the first round by Joannette Kruger.

ITF Circuit finals

Singles: 4 (1–3)

Doubles: 6 (3–3)

References

External links
 
 

1973 births
Living people
Czech female tennis players
Czechoslovak female tennis players